Hema Malini (born 16 October 1948) is an Indian actress, director, producer, and politician. She is primarily known for her work in Hindi films. Known for starring in both comic and dramatic roles, she is one of the most popular and successful leading actresses of mainstream Hindi cinema. She is known as Dream Girl of Hindi cinema.

Malini made her acting debut in 1963 with the Tamil film Idhu Sathiyam. Malini first acted in a lead role in Sapno Ka Saudagar (1968), and went on to feature in numerous Hindi films, frequently opposite Dharmendra, whom she married in 1980. Malini was initially promoted as the "Dream Girl", and in 1977 starred in a film of the same name.

During her career, she received eleven nominations for the Filmfare Award for Best Actress, winning the award in 1973. In 2000, Malini won the Filmfare Lifetime Achievement Award and in 2019 Filmfare Special Award for 50 Years of Outstanding Contribution to Cinema. She is also honoured with the Padma Shri, the fourth-highest civilian honour awarded by the Government of India. In 2012, the Sir Padampat Singhania University conferred an Honorary Doctorate on Malini in recognition of her contribution to Indian cinema. Malini served as chairperson of the National Film Development Corporation. In 2006, Malini received the Sopori Academy of Music And Performing Arts (SaMaPa) Vitasta award from Bhajan Sopori in Delhi for her contribution and service to Indian culture and dance. In 2013, she received the NTR National Award from the Government of Andhra Pradesh for her contribution to Indian cinema.

From 2003 to 2009, Malini was elected to the Rajya Sabha, the upper House of parliament, as a representative of the Bharatiya Janata Party. In 2014, Malini was elected to the Lok Sabha. Malini has been involved with charitable and social ventures. Currently, Malini is also a life member of the International Society for Krishna Consciousness (ISKCON).

Early life and family 
Malini was born in a Tamil Iyengar Brahmin family to Jaya Lakshmi and VSR Chakravarti Iyengar in Srirangam. She attended the Andhra Mahila Sabha in Chennai where her favourite subject was history. She studied at DTEA Mandir Marg until the 11th Standard after which she pursued her acting career.

Her first film with Dharmendra was Tum Haseen Main Jawaan (1970). The two got married in 1980. Dharmendra already had two sons and two daughters with his first wife, two of whom later became Bollywood actors – Sunny Deol and Bobby Deol. Malini and Dharmendra have two children, Esha Deol (born 1981) and Ahana Deol (born 1986).

 Madhoo Raghunath, who played the female lead in Phool Aur Kaante, Roja and Annayya, is Malini's niece.

On 11 June 2015, Hema Malini became a first-time grandmother when her younger daughter, Ahana Deol gave birth to her first child, Darien Vohra. On 19 October 2017, she became a grandmother for the second time when her elder daughter, Esha Deol Takhtani gave birth to a girl, Radhya Takhtani.

Film career

1960–1970 (Early work) 
Malini had played small roles in Pandava Vanavasam (1965) and Idhu Sathiyam (1962). In 1968, she was chosen to play the lead opposite Raj Kapoor in Sapno Ka Saudagar and promoted as Dream Girl.

1970–1979 (Established actress)  
Malini played the lead in Johnny Mera Naam (1970). Roles in subsequent films like Andaz (1971) and Lal Patthar (1971) established her as a leading actress. In 1972, she played a double role opposite Dharmendra and Sanjeev Kumar in Seeta Aur Geeta which earned her a Filmfare Best Actress Award for the film. The list of successful films she starred include Sanyasi, Dharmatma and Pratigya, Sholay, Trishul to name a few.

Malini and Dharmendra, acted together in 28 films including Sharafat, Tum Haseen Main Jawan, Naya Zamana, Raja Jani, Seeta Aur Geeta, Patthar Aur Payal, Dost (1974), Sholay (1975), Charas, Jugnu, Trishul, Apna Khoon, Azaad (1978) and Dillagi (1978).

Her chemistry with Rajesh Khanna was appreciated in Andaz and Prem Nagar.  Their subsequent films like Mehbooba and Janta Hawaldar however did not do well at the box-office.

1980–1997 (Commercial success) 
In the 80s Malini continued to star in big budget films like Kranti, Naseeb, Satte Pe Satta and Rajput, most of which proved successful at the box-office. She continued to work in heroine-centric roles after becoming a mother, in films like Aandhi Toofan, Durgaa, Ramkali, Sitapur Ki Geeta, Ek Chadar Maili Si, Rihaee and Jamai Raja.

During this period, her films with Dharmendra included Alibaba Aur 40 Chor, Baghavat, Samraat, Razia Sultan, Baghavat, and Raaj Tilak. She continued to be paired with Rajesh Khanna in movies like Dard, Bandish, Kudrat, Hum Dono, Rajput, Babu, Durgaa, Sitapur Ki Geeta and Paap Ka Ant, some of which were major successes in her career.

In the 1990s, she produced and directed the 1992 film Dil Aashna Hai, starring Divya Bharti and Shah Rukh Khan in the leading roles. She also produced and directed her second feature film Mohini (1995), starring her niece Madhoo and actor Sudesh Berry in the leading roles. She then focused on dancing and television work, only occasionally appearing in films. In 1997, she acted in Vinod Khanna's production Himalay Putra.

2000(s)–present 
After taking a break from films for a number of years, Malini made a comeback with Baghban (2003), for which she earned a Filmfare Best Actress Award nomination. She also made guest appearances in the 2004 film Veer-Zaara and the 2007 film Laaga Chunari Mein Daag, in addition to a supporting role in the 2006 film Baabul. In 2010, she acted in Sadiyaan alongside fellow veteran actress Rekha. In 2011, she produced and directed her third feature film Tell Me O Khuda which featured both her husband Dharmendra and her daughter Esha Deol, which was a box office failure. In 2017 she acted in the film Ek Thi Rani Aisi Bhi in the role of Vijaya Raje Scindia of Gwalior, with Vinod Khanna as her husband, unfortunately it was Khanna's last film. The film was directed by Gul Bahar Singh. The film was released on 21 April 2017. Her latest film is Shimla Mirchi, starring Rajkummar Rao and Rakul Preet Singh. The movie was theatrically released in India on 3 January 2020. And it was made available on Netflix on 27 January 2020.

In 2021, she was honored with Indian Film Personality of the Year Award at 52nd International Film Festival of India.

Political career
In 1999, Malini campaigned for the Bharatiya Janata Party (BJP) candidate, Vinod Khanna, a former Bollywood actor, in the Lok Sabha Elections in Gurdaspur, Punjab. In February 2004, Malini officially joined the BJP. From 2003 to 2009, she served as an MP to the upper housethe Rajya Sabha, having been nominated by the then President of India, Dr. A.P.J. Abdul Kalam. In March 2010, Malini was made general secretary of the BJP, and in February 2011, she was recommended by Ananth Kumar, the party general secretary. In the 2014 general elections for the Lok Sabha, Malini defeated the Mathura incumbent, Jayant Chaudhary (RLD) by 3,30,743 votes.

Association with social causes
Malini is a supporter of the animal rights organization, PETA India. In 2009, she wrote a letter to the Mumbai Municipal Commissioner urging him to ban horse carriages from Mumbai's busy streets. In 2011, she wrote to the Union Minister for Environment and Forests, Jairam Ramesh, urging him to ban bull fighting (jallikattu). She said, "My friends at PETA have organised investigations at Jallikattu events and documented that bulls are pulled roughly by their nose rings, punched, pummelled, hit with sharp sticks and crammed into trucks so tightly that they can barely move". PETA named Malini their "PETA Person of the Year" for 2011. As a vegetarian, she said, "Knowing that my food choices are helping the planet and animals too, makes me happy".

Other works

Dance 

Malini is a trained Bharatanatyam dancer. Her daughters Esha Deol and Ahana Deol are trained Odissi dancers. They performed with Malini in a production called Parampara for charitable events. She also performed with her daughters at the Khajuraho Dance Festival.

Malini studied Kuchipudi with Vempati Chinna Satyam and Mohiniattam with Kalamandalam Guru Gopalakrishnan. She has played a number of dance roles including Narasimha and Rama in Tulasidas's Ramcharitmanas. In 2007, she performed in Mysuru on the eve of Dussehra, where she played the roles of Sati, Parvati and Durga.

Malini owns the Natya Vihar Kalakendra dance school.

Television 
Malini has appeared in television serials such as Jai Mata Ki (2000), directed by Puneet Issar. She played the role of goddess Durga. Other television series appearances include Kamini Damini on Sahara One where she played twin sisters and Noopur which Malini directed and in which she played a Bharatanatyam dancer. Malinialso starred in Yug, a fictional series depicting the story of Indian freedom fighters and their struggle to win freedom for India.

Production and promotional work 
Malini was the editor of New Woman and Meri Saheli, Hindi women's magazine. In 2000, Malini was appointed as the first female chairperson of the National Film Development Corporation for a term of three years.

In 2007, Malini entered a promotional contract with Kent RO Systems, makers of a mineral water purifier system. Malini also became a brand ambassador for Pothys, a textile showroom in Chennai.

Accolades and recognition

Legacy 
, three biographical books about Malini have been published: Hema Malini: Diva Unveiled (2005) and Hema Malini: Beyond the Dream Girl (2017) by Ram Kamal Mukherjee, and Hema Malini: The Authorized Biography (2007) by Bhawana Somaaya.

Filmography

Bibliography

See also
 List of awards and nominations received by Hema Malini
 List of Indian film actresses

References

Further reading

External links

 
 

1948 births
Living people
People from Thanjavur district
Indian female dancers
Indian film actresses
Nandi Award winners
Indian television actresses
Actresses in Hindi cinema
Hindi-language film directors
Indian women film producers
Film producers from Uttar Pradesh
Recipients of the Padma Shri in arts
Actresses in Tamil cinema
Bharatiya Janata Party politicians from Uttar Pradesh
Nominated members of the Rajya Sabha
Indian women film directors
Indian actor-politicians
Rajya Sabha members from Karnataka
Lok Sabha members from Uttar Pradesh
India MPs 2014–2019
20th-century Indian actresses
21st-century Indian actresses
Women in Uttar Pradesh politics
20th-century Indian film directors
Dancers from Tamil Nadu
21st-century Indian women politicians
21st-century Indian politicians
20th-century Indian women politicians
20th-century Indian politicians
Women members of the Lok Sabha
Indian Vaishnavites
Screenwriters from Uttar Pradesh
Indian women screenwriters
Indian television directors
Indian television producers
21st-century Indian film directors
People from Mathura district
20th-century Indian dancers
21st-century Indian dancers
21st-century Indian women artists
20th-century Indian women artists
Businesswomen from Tamil Nadu
Filmfare Awards winners
Filmfare Lifetime Achievement Award winners
Women television producers
India MPs 2019–present
Women members of the Rajya Sabha
Women in Karnataka politics
Indian women television directors